On and On is the fourth album by All-4-One released on June 8, 1999. It was their last album on Atlantic Records. It features the single "I Will Be Right Here" (which hit #24 on the Adult Contemporary chart) as well as "I Cross My Heart" and "Smile Like Mona Lisa."

Track listing
 "Keep It Goin' On" (Nile Rodgers, Garrett Oliver) 4:15
 "One Summer Night" (Danny Webb) 3:53
 "I Will Be Right Here" (Diane Warren) 4:24
 "I Cross My Heart" (featuring Joanne Pennock) (Gary Baker, Frank J. Myers, Tim O'Brien) 3:51
 "Smile Like Mona Lisa" (Dave DeViller, Sean Hosien) 3:42
 "No Doubt" (Joanne Pennock, Jason Pennock, Tim O'Brien) 4:10
 "Whatever You Want" (Ty Lacy,  Berny Cosgrove, Kevin Clark) 4:33
 "Time to Come Home" (Andy Goldmark, Darrell Spencer) 4:02
 "If You Want Me" (Jamie Jones, Delious Kennedy, Joanne Pennock) 4:32
 "Somebody 2 Love" (Jamie Jones, Reggie Green) 4:34
 "Until You Go" (Tony Borowiak, Stayce Roberts, Freddie Tierra, Mace McAdams) 4:27
 "How To Love Again" (Jamie Jones, Delious Kennedy, Joanne Pennock) 4:54
 "Secrets" (Jamie Jones, Reggie Green) 5:21
 "Fear No More" (Marvin Winans) 1:54
 "One Summer Night" (The Classic Radio Remix) 4:18

Charts

Weekly charts

References

1999 albums
Atlantic Records albums
All-4-One albums